BMG Music Canada was the Canadian division of BMG, located in Toronto, Ontario, Canada.

History
BMG was formed in 1970. In 1986, it acquired RCA Records. In the acquisition, the company acquired RCA Victor Ltd. to form BMG Music Canada as part of a worldwide renaming of RCA's international division to BMG.  The next year BMG created a Canadian division of Ariola Records with BMG International, N.V.

Previously working for Henri Dès albums, it acquired the Lanoraie, Quebec-based Interdisc Distribution Inc. to form BMG Québec, in 1990, originally as BMG Musique du Québec under the direction of Nicolas Ferrier.

In the 1990s BMG released a number of dance compilation albums. In 1995, Paul Alofs was appointed President of BMG Canada, and former artist manager Keith Porteous was promoted to Vice President. Soon after, BMG arranged to be the Canadian distributor for the band Treble Charger.

In 1998, Lisa Zbitnew who had served as General Manager the previous year, was appointed President.

In 2004, the label merged with Sony Music Canada to create Sony BMG Music Canada Inc.

See also

 List of record labels

References

Record labels established in 1970
Record labels disestablished in 2004
Bertelsmann subsidiaries
Companies based in Toronto
Defunct record labels of Canada